Sir William Brownlow, 1st Baronet (c. 1595–1666) of Humby in Lincolnshire, was an English politician and barrister.

Origins
He was the second son of Richard Brownlow (1553–1638) of Belton in Lincolnshire, which manor he purchased, Chief Prothonotary of the Court of Common Pleas, by his wife Katharine Page, a daughter of John Page of Wembley in Middlesex. His elder brother was Sir John Brownlow, 1st Baronet (c.1594-1679) of Belton, who was created a baronet "of Belton" one day before himself.

Career
He was educated at St Mary Hall, Oxford, where he graduated with a Bachelor of Arts in 1610 or 1611. In 1617 Brownlow was called to the bar by the Inner Temple. Despite having been created by King Charles I a baronet, "of Humby, in the County of Lincoln", on 27 June 1641, one day after the baronetcy of his elder brother, he became a Parliamentarian during the Civil War. From 1653 he sat in the Long Parliament for Lincolnshire.

Marriage and children
In about 1624 he married Elizabeth Duncombe, daughter of William Duncombe, and had by her a daughter and a son:
Sir Richard Brownlow, 2nd Baronet (d.1668) of Humby, who succeeded to the baronetcy.

References

1590s births
1666 deaths
Alumni of St Mary Hall, Oxford
Baronets in the Baronetage of England
William
Members of the Inner Temple
English MPs 1653 (Barebones)
Roundheads
English lawyers
17th-century English lawyers